The 2003 Queensland Cup season was the 8th season of Queensland's top-level statewide rugby league competition run by the Queensland Rugby League. The competition featured 12 teams playing a 26-week long season (including finals) from March to September.

The Redcliffe Dolphins defeated the Burleigh Bears 31–18 in the Grand Final at Dolphin Oval, becoming the first club to win back-to-back premierships. Wynnum  Denny Lambert was named the competition's Player of the Year, winning the Courier Mail Medal.

Teams 
The Tweed Heads Seagulls, the oldest provincial club in Australia, gained entry to the competition for the 2003 season. The club applied for the 2002 season but were unsuccessful. They re-applied after the Logan Scorpions, an inaugural Queensland Cup club, ceased operations. Seagulls became the first New South Wales-based team to enter the competition. Souths Magpies acquired what remained of the Logan club and re-branded as the Souths Logan Magpies. Also in 2003, the East Coast Tigers reverted to their original name, Easts Tigers, after two seasons.

The Brisbane Broncos, Melbourne Storm and North Queensland Cowboys were again affiliated with the Toowoomba Clydesdales, Norths Devils and North Queensland Young Guns respectively.

Ladder

Finals series

Grand Final 

Burleigh, who finished as minor premiers ahead of Redcliffe on points differential, earned a week one bye in the finals before defeating the Dolphins in the major semi final to secure a spot in their second Grand Final. Redcliffe, who defeated Ipswich in the first week of the finals, faced Wynnum in the preliminary final after their loss to Burleigh. A dominant 46–26 win over the Seagulls saw them qualify for their fifth straight Grand Final and set up a rematch of the 1999 decider against Burleigh.

First half 
Burleigh started the Grand Final in the best way possible when centre Reggie Cressbrook intercepted a pass in the opening set to score under the posts. Redcliffe hit back through the competition's top try scorer Aaron Barba, who scored in the 18th minute. Barba got his second try of the game when he chased down a Shane Perry kick from a scrum win to score untouched. Barba scored his third try of the contest when he scooped up a kick from inside his own half and ran 70 metres to score just before half time.

Second half 
Redcliffe seemingly put the game beyond doubt four minutes into the second half when centre Damien Richters scored out wide. Burleigh staged a small fightback with two tries in five minutes to Tony Gray and Trent Purdon but the Dolphins truly put the game to bed when Ben Jones scored with eight minutes to play. In the 78th minute, five-eighth Shane Perry wrapped up the victory with a field goal to extend the final winning margin to 13. The win gave the Dolphins' their fourth premiership in eight seasons and their first back-to-back titles.

Player statistics

Leading try scorers

Leading point scorers

End-of-season awards 
 Courier Mail Medal: Denny Lambert ( Wynnum Seagulls)
 Rookie of the Year: Stanley Fau ( Souths Logan Magpies)

See also 

 Queensland Cup
 Queensland Rugby League

References 

2003 in Australian rugby league
Queensland Cup